Command may refer to:

Computing
 Command (computing), a statement in a computer language
 COMMAND.COM, the default operating system shell and command-line interpreter for DOS
 Command key, a modifier key on Apple Macintosh computer keyboards
 Command pattern, a software design pattern in which objects represent actions
 Voice command, in speech recognition

Military
 Military command (instruction) or military order
 Command responsibility, the doctrine of hierarchical accountability in cases of war crimes
 Command (military formation), an organizational unit
 Command and control, the exercise of authority in a military organization
 Command hierarchy, a group of people dedicated to carrying out orders "from the top"

Music
 Command (album), a 2009 album by Client
 Command Records, a record label

Sports
 Command (baseball), the ability of a pitcher to throw a pitch where he intends to
 Kansas City Command, a former professional arena football team
 Commands (horse), Australian thoroughbred racehorse

Other uses
 Command, a verb using the imperative mood or the whole sentence containing such a verb
 Command (teaching style)
 Command: Modern Air Naval Operations, strategy game

See also
 Command paper, a policy paper or report issued by, for or to the British government
 Command economy, a form of planned economy
 C-command, in theoretical linguistics
 M-command, a broader version of c-command in theoretical linguistics
 The Command (disambiguation)